The Keyhole  is a 1933 American pre-Code comedy-drama film directed by Michael Curtiz, starring Kay Francis, George Brent, Glenda Farrell and Allen Jenkins. It was released by Warner Bros. on March 25, 1933. A woman with two husbands tries to divorce one of them by heading down to Havana where things get more complicated.

Plot
Anne Brooks (Kay Francis), wife of wealthy businessman Schuyler Brooks, is being blackmailed by her former husband Maurice Le Brun who never finalized their divorce and lied to her about it. Acting on advice from Brooks' sister, Anne books a cruise ship passage to Havana, Cuba, to lure Le Brun out of the United States so that he can be blocked from re-entering.

Suspicious of her behavior, Brooks hires private detective Neil Davis (George Brent) to follow her and report on whether she is having an affair, but tells him that she is merely a young woman that he's interested in. Anne leaks to Le Brun the details of her trip and he also boards the ship. Davis makes contact with her and sends reports to Brooks that she is not having an affair, but begins to develop a romance with her himself.

Back in New York, Brooks learns about the blackmailing from his sister and leaves on a plane to Cuba to apologize to Anne for being suspicious. Meanwhile, Anne reveals to Davis that she is married to Brooks and that she is being blackmailed and he reveals that he is a private detective hired by Brooks to follow her.

Le Brun arrives at Anne's hotel room for his payoff. To save Anne's marriage, Davis persuades him to leave via the balcony so that Brooks won't find him in a compromising situation with her, but just as Brooks comes into the room, Anne kisses Davis, telling Brooks that their marriage is over. Le Brun falls from the balcony to his death, ending any further threat of blackmail.

Cast

 Kay Francis as Anne Brooks 
 George Brent as Mr. Neil Davis 
 Glenda Farrell as Dot 
 Monroe Owsley as Maurice Le Brun 
 Allen Jenkins as Hank Wales 
 Helen Ware as Portia Brooks 
 Henry Kolker as Schuyler Brooks 
 Ferdinand Gottschalk as Brooks' Lawyer
 George Chandler as Joe - Desk Clerk

References

External links

 
 
 
 

1933 films
Films directed by Michael Curtiz
American black-and-white films
1933 comedy-drama films
American comedy-drama films
1930s English-language films
1930s American films